As Long as I Live Tour was the fifth concert tour by American R&B/pop singer Toni Braxton in support of her eighth studio album, Sex & Cigarettes. The tour kicked off on January 19, 2019, in Columbia, South Carolina and ended on November 19 in London, U.K. The tour also included female R&B group SWV and singer Babyface as featured special guests in selected Northern America dates.

Background 
On September 14, 2017, Braxton released the lead buzz single "Deadwood" from her new album, Sex & Cigarettes. The single reached no. 7 on Billboard Adult R&B Songs chart. A remix EP for the song "Coping" was released in November 2017. The single reached no. 1 on the Billboard Dance Charts, earning Braxton's 6th single to reach #1 on that chart. This was followed by the smash hit single "Long as I Live" which created number one on the Billboard R&B Songs chart. The album and the latter single was nominated for a combined 3 2019 Grammy Awards and the single "Long as I Live" was awarded, Most Outstanding Song in the 2019 NAACAP Awards.

Following the album's three hit singles, Toni Braxton announced in October 2018 she would kick-off her As Long as I Live World Tour in 2019 with R&B female group SWV and singer Babyface as the featured special guests joining her during the North American leg of her tour. Toni Braxton merchandise purchased from the singer's official website allowed for early access to tickets for the tour. On October 26, general ticket sales were officially available for purchases via LiveNation online. In August 2019, tickets went on sale for the two city leg of her tour in South Africa. Followed by the London, U.K. concert going on sale in September 2019, with pre-sale tickets available via the venue, Event Apollo's website; with general sale for the London show going live on September 6.

Opening acts 
SWV (Northern America, selected dates)
Babyface (North America, selected dates)
Shekhinah (South Africa)
 DJ Hudson (South Africa)

Set list 
"He Wasn't Man Enough"
"How Many Ways"
"Seven Whole Days"
"You're Makin' Me High"
"Just Be a Man About It"
"Love Shoulda Brought You Home"
"I Heart You"
"You Mean the World to Me"
"Deadwood"
"Sex & Cigarettes" / "FOH"
"My Heart"1
"Another Sad Love Song"
"Breathe Again"
"I Love Me Some Him"
"Un-Break My Heart"
"Long as I Live"

1 performed at selected dates in North America

Additional notes 
February 8, show at the Prudential Center, Babyface and Toni performed "A Rose Still A Rose."
March 3, show at Microsoft Theater included Toni and Babyface performing their hit duet single "Give U My Heart."

Shows

Cancelled and rescheduled shows

References

External links 
Official website

Toni Braxton concert tours
2019 concert tours